The Eddie Powers Memorial Trophy is awarded annually by the Ontario Hockey League to the player scoring the most points in the regular season. The trophy was donated by the Toronto Marlboro Athletic Club in memory of athlete and coach Eddie Powers. It was first awarded in the 1945–46 OHA season. The Ontario Hockey League had retroactively recognized winners dating back to the 1933–34 OHA season. The winner of the Eddie Powers Memorial Trophy may also win the CHL Top Scorer Award.

Winners
List of winners of the Eddie Powers Memorial Trophy.
 Blue background denotes also won CHL Top Scorer Award.

See also
 Jean Béliveau Trophy – Quebec Major Junior Hockey League top scorer
 Bob Clarke Trophy – Western Hockey League top scorer
 List of Canadian Hockey League awards

References

External links
 Ontario Hockey League
 Elite Prospects - Award - OHL Most Points (Eddie Powers Trophy)

Ontario Hockey League trophies and awards
Awards established in 1946